The 2018 Crawley Borough Council election took place on 3 May 2018 to elect members of Crawley Borough Council in West Sussex, England. This was on the same day as other local elections. The Labour Party retained control of the council, with no seats changing hands.

Ward results

Bewbush

Broadfield North

Broadfield South

Furnace Green

Ifield

Langley Green

Maidenbower

Northgate & West Green

Pound Hill North

Pound Hill South and Worth

Southgate

West Green

References

2018 English local elections
2018
2010s in West Sussex